Jefferson Healthcare Hospital is a 25-bed Critical Access Hospital located in Port Townsend, Washington.  Established in 1890 by the Sisters of Providence as St. John Hospital, it is presently independently owned and operated by Jefferson County Public Hospital District No. 2, doing business as Jefferson Healthcare.

History
The main hospital was founded in 1890 as St. John Hospital by the Sisters of Providence. In 1975, ownership of the hospital transferred to Jefferson County Public Hospital District No. 2, which had been formed following a special election on August 15, 1961 authorizing establishment of the District. In 1985 the facility was renamed Jefferson General Hospital. In 2004, the name was again updated to Jefferson Healthcare Hospital, to better reflect its status as the nucleus of an integrated healthcare system that had grown to include a number of hospital-based and community clinics.

In May 2013, the hospital revealed plans for a new  emergency and specialty services building. The project was estimated to cost between $15 and 20 million, and broke ground to begin renovations in June 2015.

Services
The hospital operates a level IV trauma center, and is the sole hospital in Jefferson County.  It is designated as a critical access hospital.

References

External links
Jefferson Healthcare - Medical Center

Hospital buildings completed in 1890
Hospitals established in 1890
Hospitals in Washington (state)
Buildings and structures in Port Townsend, Washington